Man Asaad ( / , ; born 20 November 1993) is a Syrian heavyweight weightlifter who competes in the +109 kg category. He won the bronze medal in the men's +109kg event at the 2020 Summer Olympics held in Tokyo, Japan. He also won bronze medal in the men's +109kg Clean&Jerk event at the 2022 World Weightlifting Championships held in Bogotá, Colombia.

Career 
He made his debut appearance at the Olympics representing Syria at the 2016 Olympics and was placed 15th in +105kg event. He was placed fifth at the 2018 Asian Games. On 11 April 2010, he was given a two-year ban by the International Weightlifting Federation after he tested positive for the banned substance metandienone.

He qualified to represent Syria at the 2020 Summer Olympics in Tokyo, Japan. He competed in the men's +109 kg event with a total of 424 kg and claimed bronze medal in the event. It was also Syria's first medal of the 2020 Tokyo Olympics.

He won two medals at the 2022 Mediterranean Games held in Oran, Algeria. He won the silver medal in the men's +102 kg Snatch event and the gold medal in the men's +102 kg Clean & Jerk event.

Major results

See also 
 Syria at the Summer Olympics
 Weightlifting at the Summer Olympics

Notes

References

External links

 

1993 births
Living people
Syrian male weightlifters
Olympic weightlifters of Syria
Weightlifters at the 2016 Summer Olympics
Weightlifters at the 2018 Asian Games
Asian Games competitors for Syria
People from Hama
Weightlifters at the 2020 Summer Olympics
Medalists at the 2020 Summer Olympics
Olympic medalists in weightlifting
Olympic bronze medalists for Syria
Syrian sportspeople in doping cases
Doping cases in weightlifting
Mediterranean Games gold medalists for Syria
Mediterranean Games silver medalists for Syria
Mediterranean Games medalists in weightlifting
Competitors at the 2022 Mediterranean Games
20th-century Syrian people
21st-century Syrian people